Andrea Wulf (born 1967) is a German-British historian and writer who has written books, newspaper articles and book reviews.

Biography 
Wulf was born in New Delhi, India, a child of German developmental aid workers, and spent the first five years of her life there, then grew up in Hamburg. She studied first at the University of Lüneburg, and then design history at The Royal College of Art, London.

Wulf is a public speaker, delivering lectures in the UK and USA. She was the guest speaker at the Kitt Peak National Observatory.

Her book The Brother Gardeners was long-listed for the Samuel Johnson Prize and received a CBHL Annual Literature Award in 2010. In 2016, she won the Royal Society Insight Investment Science Book Prize and the Royal Geographical Society's Ness Award for her book The Invention of Nature.

Chasing Venus: the Race to Measure the Heavens

Chasing Venus: the Race to Measure the Heavens (2012) is a non-fiction book about expeditions of scientists who set off around the world in 1761 and 1769 to collect data relating to the transit of Venus and thereby to measure and understand better the universe.  The narrative style provides glimpses into the personalities of those involved, their aims and obsessions, their failures and discoveries, and provides the historic context of the period in the 18th century when modern-day scientifically accurate mapping and international scientific collaboration began.

The Invention of Nature

The Invention of Nature: Alexander von Humboldt's New World (2015) is a nonfiction book about the Prussian naturalist, explorer and geographer Alexander von Humboldt. Wulf makes the case that Humboldt synthesised knowledge from many different fields to form a vision of nature as one interconnected system, that would go on to influence scientists, activists and the public.

Books
 This Other Eden: Seven Great Gardens and 300 Years of English History Little, Brown, 2005, 
 The Brother Gardeners: A Generation of Gentlemen Naturalists and the Birth of an Obsession Vintage Books, 2008, 
 Founding Gardeners: The Revolutionary Generation, Nature, and the Shaping of the American Nation Knopf Doubleday, 2012, 
 Chasing Venus: the Race to Measure the Heavens (2012) 
 The Invention of Nature: Alexander von Humboldt's New World, Knopf, 2015, 
 The Adventures of Alexander Von Humboldt, Pantheon, 2019 (co-authored with Lillian Melcher - illustrator) 
 Magnificent Rebels: The First Romantics and the Invention of the Self, Knopf, 2022,

References

External links

1972 births
Living people
Alumni of the Royal College of Art
English biographers
English women non-fiction writers
British women biographers
Historians of science
People from New Delhi